Richard James Gardner (born February 1, 1981) is a retired American professional football player. He last played defensive back for Kiel Baltic Hurricanes of the German Football League. A Penn State University Football graduate and 3rd round draft pick, he played three seasons in the National Football League for the Tennessee Titans from 2004–2005, and the Seattle Seahawks in 2006.

Currently he resides in Gary, Indiana with his wife and children. In 2017 he founded a nonprofit with his wife Maroon Village, where they work with Student Athletes building resilience on and off the playing field through performance training and practices such as yoga, meditation and breathwork. 

Coming to Penn State as a walk-on in 1999, Gardner started every game in his final two seasons. He totaled 141 tackles, two fumble recoveries, 15 pass deflections and three interceptions for 109 yards and two touchdowns. He was named a third-team All-American his senior year and honorable mention All-Big Ten his senior and junior years. He graduated from Penn State with a Bachelor of Arts in economics in December 2003.

NFL 
A third-round draft pick (#92 overall) for the Titans in 2004, the 5'10", 195 lb. Gardner made 24 tackles and an interception in his two seasons there, playing cornerback and special teams. He was waived by the Titans on September 4, 2006. He signed with the Seahawks in week 17 of the 2006 season and was waived by the team on July 11, 2007.

External links
Gardner walking on a cloud, The Nashville City Paper, June 30, 2004
Rich Gardner Conference Call, Tennessee Titans website
Rookie CB enjoying NFL experience, Tennessee Titans website, July 8, 2004

1981 births
Living people
American football cornerbacks
Players of American football from Chicago
Penn State Nittany Lions football players
People from Carbondale, Illinois
Seattle Seahawks players
Tennessee Titans players